Burnin' at 20 Below is the second and final album released by the rapper Antoinette, which released on May 30, 1990, on Next Plateau Entertainment. Production was by DJ Doc, Kurtis Mantronik, Ellis Jay, and Kenni Hairston. The album peaked at No. 66 on the Billboard Top R&B Albums chart. Singles from the album were "Never Get Enough" and "She Operates Around the Clock", but failed to chart.

Track listing
"Bring It Home"- 3:50 
"Who Gives the Orders (Interrupted by If the Price Is Right)"- 6:36 
"She Operates around the Clock"- 4:29 
"Let's Take it from the Top"- 3:30 
"The Fox that Rox the Box"- 4:00 
"I Wanna be Me"- 4:45 
"Love or Hype" [Remix]- 4:35 
"Never Get Enough"- 4:45 
"You Got What I Need"- 5:00 
"In My House" [Remix]- 4:10 
"It's Your Thing"- 4:28

References

1990 albums
Antoinette (rapper) albums
Albums produced by Kurtis Mantronik
Next Plateau Entertainment albums